Austin Eugene "Cap" Lathrop (October 5, 1865July 26, 1950) was an American politician, industrialist, and outspoken opponent of Alaskan statehood. He has been called "Alaska's first home-grown millionaire."

Early life
"Cap" Lathrop was born in 1865 in Lapeer County, Michigan to Eugene Lathrop and Susan (Sarah) Miriah Parsons Lathrop. He was expelled from school in the ninth grade for damages caused when he tampered with a water heater. He is a descendant of Reverend John Lathrop (1584-1653) of Barnstable, Mass. (ancestors of Austin are, Eugene, Horace, Abiel, Benjamin, Israel, Samuel, son of John Lathrop.

After the Great Seattle Fire of 1889, Lathrop moved to that city and worked for a time as a contractor. He made plans to settle in Anacortes, but the Panic of 1893 disrupted his business and he was forced to return to Seattle. In 1895, he purchased a steam ship, the L.J. Perry, and embarked on a new venture, transporting goods to the Territory of Alaska. Once the Klondike Gold Rush started, business picked up, and soon he was transporting both prospectors and the goods that they required.

Alaska
Lathrop married a widow, Mrs. Cosby McDowell of Seattle in a 1901 ceremony in Valdez, Alaska, where Lathrop had taken up residence. This was the first wedding in the history of Valdez.  It was her third marriage, and she was a very popular socialite among the Alaskan crowd who knew her. Mrs. McDowell Lathrop and her daughter relocated to Seattle in 1909 for health reasons. She died there in 1910 from paresis (complications of syphilis) in a house built for her by Lathrop, and was cared for 24 hours/day by a Dr. Loughery, who was hired for the task by Lathrop, until her death. The house became known as Washington State's first "psychiatric hospital", and Loughery went on to manage Western State Hospital at Steilacoom and Northern State Hospital at Sedro Woolley.

In 1902, Lathrop's California-Alaska Mining and Development Company set up a camp at the mouth of the Kluvesna River, and in 1903, Lathrop drilled unsuccessfully for oil in Cold Bay.

Lathrop moved to Cordova in 1908,  and was elected mayor in 1911.  That same year he converted a clothing store into a movie theater, The Empress. He went on to construct Empress movie theaters in Anchorage (1916) and Fairbanks (1927), as well as the Lacey Street Theater (Fairbanks, 1936–1940) and the Fourth Avenue Theatre (Anchorage, 1941–1947; construction was interrupted by World War II). From 1920 to 1922, Lathrop served in the Alaska Territorial House of Representatives. In 1924, he produced The Chechahcos, the first feature-length film shot entirely in Alaska.

Lathrop moved to Fairbanks, and in 1929, purchased the Fairbanks Daily News-Miner. In 1937, he began work on the building that would house KFAR, Fairbanks's first radio station licensed under the Communications Act of 1934. The call-letters formed an acronym for "Key for Alaska's Riches". KFAR made its inaugural broadcast on October 1, 1939. In 1948, Lathrop opened his second radio station, KENI in Anchorage.

In 1932, Lathrop became a member of the Board of Trustees of the Alaska Agricultural College and the School of Mines. In 1935, the college's name was changed to the University of Alaska. The Board of Trustees became the Board of Regents. Lathrop would continue to serve in this position until his death.

Lathrop feared that Alaska statehood would entail taxes and regulations that would harm business, and the Daily News-Miner took a stance challenging pro-statehood Territorial Governor Ernest Gruening.

On July 26, 1950, Lathrop was killed in an accident when he was struck by a railroad car in the yard of his Suntrana coal plant.

Legacy

The Fairbanks Empress Theater was the first concrete building constructed in Fairbanks.  Lathrop set out to prove detractors wrong who had said that a concrete building would crumble in the extreme winter climate. As of 2009, the building still stands.

Austin Lathrop is said to have been the model for the character of "Zeb 'Czar' Kennedy" in Edna Ferber's 1958 novel, Ice Palace. Kennedy was played by Richard Burton in the 1960 film adaptation.

Lathrop High School was constructed in Fairbanks in 1955, and named to honor the late Fairbanks resident. The Austin E. Lathrop Residence Hall of the University of Alaska Fairbanks was opened in 1962.

Many of the top Lathrop Company lieutenants went on to have a substantial business success of their own. Augie Hiebert, who Lathrop brought to Alaska to put KFAR on the air, started Northern Television. Al Bramstedt, another of Lathrop's broadcast engineers, started Midnight Sun Broadcasters. Both had failed to convince Lathrop of the need to invest in the emerging field of television, as Lathrop felt it would take business away from his movie theaters. Both companies started television stations in Anchorage in 1953 and in Fairbanks in 1955.  Both companies also owned and operated numerous radio stations. Midnight Sun Broadcasters would operate both KFAR and KENI through to the 1980s.

Harry Hill, another Lathrop lieutenant, became a real estate developer. Anchorage's city hall, originally known as the Hill Building, was built by Hill in 1962 as office space for the federal government. The Hill Building was one of the first skyscrapers built in Anchorage's central business district. All three of these individuals were seeded with money from Lathrop's estate.

In the 1970s, Lathrop's theaters and their successors were owned by a media conglomerate named Wometco. In Alaska, they were referred to as "Wometco-Lathrop Theaters."

In the 1980s, the downtown core of Fairbanks was the subject of discussions related to urban renewal in the wake of the completion of the trans-Alaska pipeline and the shift in business following the completion of 3 shopping malls in 1977. The buildings constructed by Lathrop on Second Avenue were considered for demolition until the intervention of persons concerned with maintaining Lathrop's legacy in the community. The Lathrop Building (516 Second Avenue, completed 1936) would be sold to Jim Whitaker and his wife for what has been publicly described at numerous civic meetings as being pennies on the dollar.

In 1988, Alaska Business Monthly nominated Lathrop to the Alaska Business Hall of Fame.

References 

 Biography at the University of Alaska
 Austin Eugene Lathrop genealogy
 "Mining, Media, Movies"

Bibliography
 Tower, Elizabeth A. Mining, Media, Movies: Cap Lathrop's Keys for Alaska's Riches 1991
 Tower, Elizabeth A. Alaska's First Homegrown Millionaire 2006

External links
 Austin Lathrop at 100 Years of Alaska's Legislature

1865 births
1950 deaths
Accidental deaths in Alaska
Alaska Republicans
Businesspeople from Fairbanks, Alaska
Mayors of places in Alaska
Members of the Alaska Territorial Legislature
20th-century American politicians
Politicians from Anchorage, Alaska
People from Cordova, Alaska
Politicians from Fairbanks, Alaska
People from Lapeer County, Michigan
People from Valdez, Alaska
People of pre-statehood Alaska
Railway accident deaths in the United States
University of Alaska regents